Mathilde Mukantaba (born 1958) is a Rwandan politician and diplomat born in Butare, currently working as the Rwanda's ambassador to the USA and non-resident Ambassador to Mexico, Brazil, and Argentina.  She is the President and co-founder of the non-profit Friends of Rwanda Association (F.O.R.A.).

References

Women ambassadors
Living people
1958 births
Ambassadors of Rwanda to the United States
Ambassadors of Rwanda to Mexico
Ambassadors of Rwanda to Brazil
Ambassadors of Rwanda to Argentina
University of Burundi alumni
California State University, Sacramento alumni